2K2 may refer to:

 the year 2002
 Olfactory receptor 2K2
 the location identifier for Air Park South, a former American airport in Missouri

Video games
 NBA 2K2, 2001 video game
 NCAA College Football 2K2, 2001 video game
 NFL 2K2, 2001 video game
 NHL 2K2, 2002 video game
 Tennis 2K2, 2001 vivdeo game
 World Series Baseball 2K2, 2001 video game